The Ottoman Turkish satirical magazine Güleryüz (meaning "laughing face" in Turkish)  appeared in Istanbul weekly from 1921 to 1923 with a total of 122 editions. Its publisher and founder, Sedat Simavi (1896-1952), was a Turkish journalist, political cartoonist, writer and film director. He is also known as co-founder of the Turkish Association of Journalists (Türkiye Gazeteciler Cemiyeti) in 1946 and the daily newspaper Hürriyet (1948).

During the Turkish War of Independence (1919-1923) Güleryüz was the most influential humoristic magazine in Istanbul. It supported Mustafa Kemal Atatürk and frequently published his cartoons. Moreover, it publicly contributed to the assumption that the war could be won. Parts of its volumes were regularly censored.

Its texts and numerous caricatures were written and designed by Sedat Simavi himself. The contributors included Ahmet Rasim, Ercümend Ekrem, Fazıl Ahmed, Cevad Şakir and Mustafa İzzet.

As a counterpart and support of the Turkish government the politico-humorous journal Aydede was founded in 1922.

References

Defunct magazines published in Turkey
Magazines established in 1921
Magazines disestablished in 1923
Magazines published in Istanbul
Turkish-language magazines
Satirical magazines published in Turkey
Weekly magazines published in Turkey